Fort Hill is a hill in Barnstable County, Massachusetts. It is located northeast of Orleans in the Town of Eastham. Skiff Hill is located north of Fort Hill.

References

Mountains of Massachusetts
Mountains of Barnstable County, Massachusetts